Charlottetown-Lewis Point was a provincial electoral district for the Legislative Assembly of the Canadian province of Prince Edward Island. It was previously called Charlottetown-Spring Park.

Members
The riding has elected the following Members of the Legislative Assembly:

Election results

Charlottetown-Lewis Point, 2007–2019

2016 electoral reform plebiscite results

Charlottetown-Spring Park, 1996–2007

References

 Charlottetown-Lewis Point information

Politics of Charlottetown
Former provincial electoral districts of Prince Edward Island